The 132nd Air Refueling Squadron (132 ARS) is a unit of the Maine Air National Guard 101st Air Refueling Wing located at Bangor Air National Guard Base, Bangor, Maine.  It is equipped with the KC-135R Stratotanker.

History

World War II
Trained with V-72 Vengeance aircraft. Moved to India, via Australia, July–September 1943. Assigned to Tenth Air Force. Operating from India and using A-36A Apaches. The 528th Fighter Squadron having its markings as black reverse diagonal bands painted on a yellowtail. The red nose was also a squadron marking. Many planes of the squadron had a girl's name on the nose but very few had any artwork.

The squadron supported Allied ground forces in northern Burma; covered bombers that attacked Rangoon, Insein, and other targets; bombed enemy airfields at Myitkyina and Bhamo; and conducted patrol and reconnaissance missions to help protect transport planes that flew The Hump route between India and China.

Converted to P-51C Mustangs in May 1944. Moved to Burma in July and continued to support ground forces, including Merrill's Marauders; also flew numerous sweeps over enemy airfields in central and southern Burma.

Moved to China in August 1944 and assigned to Fourteenth Air Force. Escorted bombers, flew interception missions, struck the enemy's communications, and supported ground operations, serving in combat until the end of the war. Ferried P-51's from India for the Chinese Air Force in November 1945. Returned to the US in December 1945.

Inactivated in early 1946.

Maine Air National Guard
The wartime 528th Fighter Squadron was redesignated as the 132nd Fighter Squadron and was allotted to the Maine Air National Guard, on 24 May 1946. It was organized at Dow Field, Bangor, Maine, and was extended federal recognition on 4 February 1947.  The 132nd was equipped with F-47D Thunderbolts and was initially assigned to the Massachusetts ANG 67th Fighter Wing.  It was later assigned to the Maine ANG 101st Fighter Group on 4 April 1947 after the Maine ANG group was recognized and activated.

Air defense mission

The 132nd replaced their F-47 Thunderbolts with jet Lockheed F-80C Shooting Stars in the summer of 1948 and were redesignated with the "Jet" suffix on 1 August.  With the surprise invasion of South Korea on 25 June 1950 and the regular military's lack of readiness, most of the Air National Guard was called active duty.  The 132nd was federalized on 10 February 1951 and redesignated as the 132nd Fighter-Interceptor Squadron as was its parent, which became the 101st Fighter-Interceptor Group. The group remained assigned to the group, however it was attached first to the 101st Fighter-Interceptor Wing, then to the 23rd Fighter-Interceptor Wing.

On 6 February 1952, the 132nd was transferred to the 4711th Defense Wing, which replaced the 23rd wing at Presque Isle Air Force Base. With the end of its federalization period, the squadron's mission, personnel, and F-80C jets were transferred to the active-duty 49th Fighter-Interceptor Squadron on 1 November 1952. The squadron was released from active duty and returned to the control of the State of Maine.

Upon its return to Maine control, the 132nd was re-equipped with F-51H Mustang prop-interceptors, however, in 1954, the squadron would return to jet interceptors, the F-94A Starfire.  The air defense mission for the Maine Air National Guard continued for the next twenty years, the squadron upgrading its aircraft every few years as more modern interceptors were passed down from Air Defense Command as they were replaced by new active-duty aircraft.

The ADC radar detection stations at Brunswick, Bucks Harbor, Caswell, Charleston, and Topsham were ready to make detection and calls for a scramble. Within three minutes the 13sd could be airborne and heading for a prospective rendezvous point. After identifying any intruders, the interceptor aircraft were supposed to radio back to the Ground Control Interceptor (GCI) station for further instructions.  Beginning in 1955, the squadron stood 24/7/365 runway alert at Dow AFB ready to respond to aircraft not readily identifiable by radar or pre-filed flight plans.

In 1968 Dow Air Force Base was closed as a result of Air Force-wide downsizing directed by Secretary of Defense Robert McNamara.  The closure was in part directed due to the desire by McNamara to reduce the size of the Air Force B-52 Stratofortress fleet, the increasing cost of the Vietnam War and the change to Intercontinental Ballistic Missile (ICBMs) as the primary strategic deterrence force.

With the inactivation of Dow AFB in 1968, most of the base was purchased by the city of Bangor and reopened the following year as Bangor International Airport. That portion of Dow AFB was not turned over to the city became the basis for the current Air National Guard Base and the Maine Army National Guard's Army Aviation Support Facility.

In November 1969, the 132nd FIS became one of the first Air National Guard squadrons to operate the F-101B Voodoo.

Air refueling
On 1 July 1976, the 101st was relieved from Aerospace Defense Command and transferred to Strategic Air Command (SAC), becoming a KC-135A Stratotanker unit.  This was part of the downsizing of ADCOM, with the probability of an air attack by Soviet bombers and fighters being remote in the age of the ICBM.  The 101st was re-designated as an Air Refueling Wing, the 132nd an Air Refueling Squadron.

In 1977, the 132nd deployed to RAF Mildenhall, England, as part of the European Tanker Task Force. In 1978, it began to stand alert with the SAC active force.  In October 1978 The 101st AFREW along with all other Air Guard Units underwent reorganization into the Dual Deputy organization structure; the 101st Air Refueling Group being inactivated on 30 September.

In August 1979, the 101st became the first Air National Guard unit to host a tanker task force, and during the fall, the 101st joined forces with 16 KC-135A's providing air refueling support for "Crested Cap". This airpower exercise tested the deployment capability of Air Force fighter aircraft moving from the U.S. to Europe in support of NATO war efforts there.

During the 1980s, the 101st continued to participate in Strategic Air Command exercises like Global Shield and Giant Voice. In 1984, the 101st converted from its aging KC-135A fleet with the new fue-efficient KC-135Es and the receipt of its first Air Force Outstanding Unit Award. The wing engaged in routine worldwide deployments with its KC-135s.

1990/1991 Gulf Crisis
Early on the morning of 7 August 1990, Operation Desert Shield, a build-up of friendly forces designed to contain the spread of Iraqi aggression, began. A telephone alert asked every crew member of the 132nd Air Refueling Squadron to provide maximum availability so that an immediate response capability could be developed. All 125 Operations crew members stepped forward in voluntary support.

The unit began functioning on a 24-hour, seven-days-a-week basis. Numerous Desert Shield missions would be flown in the month of August as the 132nd helped refuel transport aircraft and fighters heading to the United States Air Forces Central (CENTAF) bases in the Middle East. Volunteers were placed on full active duty status for as long as needed.  Close to 100 guard members reported during the next few days as additional KC-135s arrived TDY from other ANG units, together with the 132nd's own KC-135E aircraft forming an Air National Guard tanker task force.  By 1 October, the 101st's heavy support of MAC flights in transit from the West Coast to bases in Saudi Arabia began to slow. The 101st ARW became one of 12 National Guard units tasked with providing refueling support to Air Force units deployed to Saudi Arabia.

On 12 October the 101st began deployment of its assets to Saudi Arabia to form the 1709th Air Refueling Wing (Provisional) at King Abdul Aziz Air Base, Jeddah.  Personnel and aircraft, however, were dispersed at several locations in the Middle East, including Al Banteen Air Base, Abu Dhabi, United Arab Emirates; Morón Air Base, Spain; Cairo West Airport, Egypt; and other locations.  By January 1991, the build-up of men and material in-theater was complete. Operation Desert Storm, the attack phase of the Allied plan to liberate Kuwait and destroy Iraq's army, was ready to begin. With its strategic location on the Atlantic shore, the 101st mission reverted to an "Air-Bridge" mode, refueling transiting aircraft heading across the Atlantic or inbound from RAF Mildenhall, England, which served on the other end of the transatlantic route to the Middle East.

After a short 100 hours of ground combat, Iraq's elite Republican Guard quickly collapsed and Kuwait was easily recaptured by Coalition ground forces. Emotional returns, punctuated by parades, bands, speeches, tears, and bear-hugs were commonplace in New Hampshire as they were throughout the country. Many deployed units returning from CENTAF bases stopped at Bangor AGB on their way to their home bases. The 101st, its aircraft festooned with yellow ribbons painted above the boom, remained in "air-bridge" mode, supporting the returning traffic. By late April almost everyone had come home safely. There had been no casualties.

Post Cold War Error 

In March 1992, with the end of the Cold War, the 101st adopted the Air Force Objective Organization plan.  The Tri-Deputy organizational structure was revised with the 101st Operations Group, 101st Maintenance Group, 101st Mission Support Group and the 101st Medical Group being formed and the 132nd Air Refueling Squadron being assigned to the 101st Operations Group.  On 30 June, Strategic Air Command was inactivated as part of the Air Force reorganization after the end of the Cold War. It was replaced by Air Combat Command (ACC). In 1993, ACC transferred its KC-135 tanker force to the new Air Mobility Command (AMC).

The unit engaged in routine deployments and training until 1994 when the 101st began operating in the Northeast Tanker Task Force together with the New Hampshire Air National Guard. The situation in Bosnia-Herzegovina and "Operation Deny Flight" continued to involve 101st aircraft, crews, and support personnel.

In 2001, with the advent of the Global War on Terrorism, Maine ANG KC-135s were used for air refueling aircraft flying Combat Air Patrols over major United States Cities as part of Operation Noble Eagle (ONE).  132nd ARS aircraft were deployed to Air Forces Central (AFCENT) in the middle east as Air Expeditionary Units, providing refueling for combat aircraft during Operation Iraqi Freedom (OIF) and Operation Enduring Freedom (OEF) in Afghanistan.

In 2007, the 132nd's KC-135E-model aircraft were replaced throughout the summer with quieter, more efficient R-models. With their new CFM-56 engines, a 50 percent decrease in noise resulted, and emissions were reduced 90 percent, while range, fuel off-load capability, and reliability were all increased.

Lineage
 Constituted as the 382nd Bombardment Squadron (Light) on 28 January 1942.
 Activated on 2 March 1942
 Redesignated 382nd Bombardment Squadron (Dive) on 27 Ju1y 1942
 Redesignated 528th Fighter-Bomber Squadron on 30 September 1943
 Redesignated 528th Fighter Squadron, Single Engine on 30 May 1944
 Inactivated on 6 Jan 1946
 Redesignated 132nd Fighter Squadron, Single Engine and allotted to the National Guard on 24 May 1946.
 Activated on 3 February 1947
 Received federal recognition on 5 February 1947
 Redesignated 132nd Fighter Squadron, Jet on 1 August 1948
 Federalized and ordered to active service on: 10 February 1951
 Redesignated 132nd Fighter-Interceptor Squadron on 10 February 1951
 Released from active duty, inactivated, and returned to Maine state control, 1 November 1952
 Activated on 1 November 1952
 Redesignated 132nd Air Refueling Squadron, Heavy on 1 July 1976
 Federalized and ordered to active service on: 12 October 1990
 Released from active duty and returned to Maine state control, 31 March 1991
 Redesignated 132nd Air Refueling Squadron on 16 March 1992
 Components designated as: 132nd Expeditionary Air Refueling Squadron when deployed as part of an Air and Space Expeditionary unit after June 1996.

Assignments
 311th Bombardment (later Fighter-Bomber; Fighter) Group, 2 Mar 1942 – 6 Jan 1946
 67th Fighter Wing, 4 February 1947
 101st Fighter Group (later 101st Fighter-Interceptor Group), 4 April 1947 (attached to 101st Fighter-Interceptor Wing until 21 July 1951, 23rd Fighter-Interceptor Wing until 6 February 1952)
 4711th Defense Wing, 6 February 1952
 101st Fighter-Interceptor Group, 1 November 1952
 101st Fighter-Interceptor Wing (later 101st Air Defense Wing), 1 July 1954
 101st Fighter Group (Air Defense) (later 101st Fighter-Interceptor Group), 1 July 1960
 101st Air Refueling Wing, 1 July 1976
 101st Operations Group, 16 March 1992 – present

Stations

 Will Rogers Field, Oklahoma, 2 March 1942
 Hunter Field, Georgia, 4 July 1942
 Waycross Army Air Field, Georgia, 22 October 1942 – 18 July 1943
 Nawadih Airfield, India, 14 September 1943
 Dinjan Airfield, India, 11 October 1943
 Tingkawk Sakan Airfield, Burma, 6 July 1944
 Shwangliu, China, 24 August 1944
 Detachments operated from Hanchung, China, and Liangshan, China, September 1944 – January 1945
 Detachments operated from Hsian, China, beginning 15 February 1945

 Hsian, China, August 1945
 Shanghai, China, 22 October2 – 14 December 1945
 Fort Lawton, Washington, 5–6 January 1946
 Dow Field (later Dow Air Force Base), Maine, 4 February 1947 – 1 November 1952
 Dow Air Force Base (later Bangor International Airport, Bangor Air National Guard Base), Maine, 1 November 1952

Aircraft

 V-72 Vengeance 1942
 A-36 Apache 1943–1944
 P-51 Mustang, 1944–1945
 F-47D Thunderbolt, 1947–1948
 F-51D Mustang, 1949
 F-80C Shooting Star, 1949–1952
 F-86F Sabre 1952–1955
 F-94A Starfire, 1955–1957

 F-89D Scorpion, 1957–1959
 F-89J Scorpion, 1959–1969
 F-102A Delta Dagger 1959
 F-101B Voodoo 1969–1976
 KC-135A Stratotanker, 1976–1984
 KC-135E Stratotanker, 1984–2007
 KC-135R Stratotanker, 2007 – present

See also

References

Notes

Bibliography

 
 Francillion, Rene J, (1990) McDonnell Douglas Aircraft: Since 1920, Naval Institute Press, Annapolis, Maryland
 
 
 McLaren, David (2004), Lockheed P-80/F-80 Shooting Star: A Photo Chronicle, Schiffer Publishing, Ltd.; First Edition, 
 
 
 101st Air Refueling Wing website

External links
 132nd Air Refueling Squadron at globalsecurity.org

Squadrons of the United States Air National Guard
Air refueling squadrons of the United States Air Force
Military units and formations in Maine